Jeris Pendleton (born November 7, 1983) is a former American football defensive tackle. He's the NFL's oldest player to be drafted in 2012 NFL Draft at 28 years old. He played college football at Joliet Junior College and Ashland University. He was drafted by the Jacksonville Jaguars in the seventh round and went on to play three NFL seasons.

College career
Pendleton was set to receive a scholarship to play football at Michigan State University but was unable to attend due to family obligations. He spent the next six years working different jobs before returning to football as a walk-on at Joliet Junior College in 2008. He later transferred to Ashland University.

Professional career

Jacksonville Jaguars
Pendleton was selected by the Jacksonville Jaguars in the 7th round with the 228th overall selection of the 2012 NFL Draft. At 28 years of age, he was one of the oldest players ever drafted. He was also the first Ashland player to be drafted since Bill Overmyer was selected by the Philadelphia Eagles in the 1972 NFL Draft.

Following the 2012 preseason, Pendleton earned a spot on the Jaguars active roster. Pendleton became the first Ashland player to make an NFL team since kicker Tim Seder, who was also a member of the Jaguars in 2002.

Pendleton was released on May 22, 2013.

Dallas Cowboys
On June 10, 2013, Pendleton signed with the Dallas Cowboys. On August 26, 2013, he was cut by the Cowboys.

Indianapolis Colts
On December 3, 2013, Pendleton was added to the Colts' Practice Squad roster. On December 26, he was promoted to the Active Roster and saw playing time during the Colts' regular season finale against the Jacksonville Jaguars. On August 7, 2014, Pendleton was placed on injured reserve due to a knee injury. .Pendleton was signed to the Colts 90 man roster June 30, 2015. On September 6, 2015, he was signed to the Colts' practice squad.

References

External links
 Ashland Eagles bio

1983 births
Living people
Players of American football from Chicago
American football defensive tackles
Ashland Eagles football players
Jacksonville Jaguars players
Dallas Cowboys players
Indianapolis Colts players
Joliet Wolves football players